Dahir Mohammed is a retired Ethiopian-American football (soccer) defender who played two seasons in Major League Soccer.

Mohammed moved to the United States as a boy.  He played for the Mineola Portuguese Soccer Club.  Mohammed attended C.W. Post College where he played on the men's soccer team from 1991 to 1994.  He was the 1994 New York Collegiate Athletic Conference Player of the Year.  In 1996, Mohammed played one game for the Pennsylvania Natives in an exhibition game against the MetroStars. In 1996, Mohammed signed with the Long Island Rough Riders of the USISL.  In August 1997, Mohammed scored the winning goal as the Rough Riders defeated the New England Revolution in a 1997 U.S. Open Cup game.  On February 1, 1997, the Revolution selected Mohammed in the first round (fifth overall) of the 1998 MLS Supplemental Draft.  He played for the Revolution until waived on November 2, 1998.  In April 1999, he joined the Staten Island Vipers.  He spent 2000 with the Rough Riders, but played three games on loan with the MetroStars. In 2002, he played for the Connecticut Wolves.  In 2004, he was with the Rough Riders, now in the USL Second Division.  Mohammed also played for the US U-23 national team.

In 2007, Mohammed coached the Brooklyn Knights.

References

External links
 
 MetroStars: Dahir Mohammed

1973 births
Living people
American soccer players
Connecticut Wolves players
Long Island Rough Riders players
Major League Soccer players
New York Red Bulls players
New England Revolution players
Staten Island Vipers players
USISL Select League players
USL Second Division players
MLS Pro-40 players
A-League (1995–2004) players
United States men's under-23 international soccer players
New England Revolution draft picks
Association football defenders